Beni Djellil or Aït Djellil (kabyle: Ath Jlil) is a town located in Kabylie in  northern Algeria.

Communes of Béjaïa Province
Béjaïa Province